Julie Wu Chu (born March 13, 1982) is an American-Canadian retired Olympic ice hockey player who played the position of forward on the United States women's ice hockey team and the position of defense with Les Canadiennes of the Canadian Women's Hockey League (CWHL). She won the Patty Kazmaier Award in 2007 for best female collegiate hockey player while at Harvard University. She finished her collegiate career as the all-time assists leader and points scorer in NCAA history with 284 points until the record was snapped in 2011. She is tied as the second-most decorated U.S. female in Olympic Winter Games history. She was selected by fellow Team USA members to be the flag bearer at the Closing Ceremony of the 2014 Winter Olympics in Sochi.

Chu has served as head coach of the Concordia Stingers women's ice hockey program in the Réseau du sport étudiant du Québec (RSEQ) conference of U Sports since 2016. She was previously an assistant coach for the University of Minnesota Duluth and helped the Minnesota–Duluth Bulldogs women's ice hockey team win their fourth NCAA Division I national championship in 2008 and served as an assistant coach with the Union Dutchwomen of Union College in 2010–2013.

Early life

Julie Wu Chu was born in Fairfield, Connecticut in 1982. Her father Wah was born in Guangzhou, Guangdong, China. Wah and his mother moved to Hong Kong when he was one year old. In 1967, when Wah was 16, they emigrated to New York City. Shortly after arriving, he met his future wife, Miriam, at a youth group meeting at a neighborhood church. Chu has a sister, Christina, and a brother, Richard. Miriam's father is Chinese and her mother is Puerto Rican. 

Chu grew up with her family in Fairfield, Connecticut. As a child, Chu participated in soccer and figure skating before transitioning into youth hockey. She attended Choate Rosemary Hall but graduated from Northwood School (Lake Placid, New York) in 2001. She deferred her acceptance into Harvard University until after the 2002 Winter Olympics. She graduated in 2007 with a concentration in psychology.

Playing career

Chu is the first Asian American woman to play for the U.S. Olympic ice hockey team; she competed in the 2002, 2006, 2010, and 2014 Winter Olympics. She is tied as the second-most decorated U.S. female in Olympic Winter Games history. The four-time Olympian was chosen through a vote of each winter sport's team captain to carry the American flag during the Closing Ceremony of the 2014 Sochi Olympics. Chu is the second ice hockey player to serve as flag bearer for Team USA.
 
During her time at Harvard, Chu became the all-time leading scorer in NCAA history and was elected as team captain. In her four years at Harvard University, she was the all-time assists leader and obtained 284 points, the most in NCAA history. She won the Patty Kazmaier Award in 2007 for best female collegiate hockey player in the United States.

International hockey

As a key member and assistant captain of Team USA, Chu won silver medals at the Olympic Games in 2002, 2010, and 2014, and a bronze in 2006. She has recorded 40 goals and 83 assists in 150 games with Team USA.

2005, 2008, 2009, 2011, & 2013 World Champion
2001, 2004, 2007, 2012 Silver Medalist

Chu was the leading scorer at the 2009 Women's World Ice Hockey Championships tournament with ten points (five goals, five assists).

As of May 8, 2015, Chu had not decided on whether or not she will return to international competition.

Professional hockey
From 2007 to 2010, Chu played forward for the professional hockey Minnesota Whitecaps of the WWHL and won the 2010 Clarkson Cup. In 2010–11, she joined the Montreal Stars in the Canadian Women's Hockey League (CWHL) and claimed her second consecutive Clarkson Cup title, becoming the first player to win the Clarkson Cup with two different teams. In 2010–11 season, Chu was one of the top-5 leading scorers, racking up 35 points, 5 goals and 30 assists in only 19 games.

Chu has also participated in both the inaugural (2014) and second (2015–16) annual CWHL All-Star Games.

Chu and forward Natalie Spooner, from the Toronto Furies, were voted captains by the public for the second annual CWHL All-Star Game, taking place January 23, 2016 at the Air Canada Centre in Toronto, Ontario. More than 33,000 votes were cast during the public voting period, with Chu leading the polls, receiving 34% of the votes and Spooner coming in second with 23% in the public poll, which ran Dec. 15-Jan. 15 at www.CWHL.ca. The event makes Chu the first non-Canadian CWHL All-Star Captain and the first visible-minority player to be named captain at an All-Star Game. Chu's Team Black went on to defeat Spooner's Team White by a score of 5–1.

Coaching career
In 2007–08 Chu was an assistant coach for the University of Minnesota-Duluth and helped the Bulldogs women's ice hockey team win their fourth NCAA Division I national championship. In the 2010–2011 hockey season, she joined the Union College women's hockey coaching staff, serving as assistant coach. She stepped down after the 2012–2013 season to focus full-time for the 2014 Winter Olympics in Sochi, Russia.

Chu currently coaches the Concordia Stingers' women's ice hockey team.

Personal life
Chu is married to Canadian hockey player and Olympic gold medalist Caroline Ouellette. Chu and Ouellette were both teammates for Les Canadiennes de Montréal and served together as assistant coaches of the University of Minnesota-Duluth and the Concordia Stingers. They previously captained their respective national women's hockey teams which have a huge rivalry, and skated against each other in three Olympic gold medal finals (2002, 2010, 2014) and over half a dozen world championships. They have two daughters, Liv (born November 2017) and Tessa (born May 2021). Chu became a permanent resident of Canada.

Accomplishments and notes
2016-17 RSEQ COACH OF THE YEAR: Julie Chu: Concordia Stingers
2014 US Olympic Team Flag Bearer – Closing Ceremonies
2014 Competed in her 4th Olympic Games for the United States (2002, 2006, 2010 and 2014)
2011 Clarkson Cup
2010 Clarkson Cup Tournament Most Valuable Player
2007–08 Assistant coach of the University of Minnesota-Duluth women's ice hockey team, which won its fourth NCAA national championship that season. At the end of the 2007–08 season, Chu stepped down to prepare for the 2010 Winter Olympics in Vancouver.
2007 Patty Kazmaier Award winner (equivalent to the Hobey Baker for NCAA women's ice hockey)
2007 Bob Allen Women's Player of the Year Award – Awarded by USA Hockey
2005 USCHO.com Defensive Forward of the Year 
Four-time All American at Harvard
Four-time finalist for Patty Kazmaier Award
All-time NCAA scoring leader (284 points in four seasons)
All-time NCAA assist leader (197 points in four seasons)
Three-time All American
Three-time NCAA Frozen Four finalist
Four-time USA Hockey Girls national champion (Connecticut Polar Bears)

Media/national publicity biography

Off The Podium.com Torino 2006 Screensaver
February 13, 2006 -People Magazine
February 2006 -Glamour Magazine
US Anti-Doping Agency 2006 Campaign
ESPN Magazine Body Issue, October 2011 edition

Endorsement campaigns

 Procter & Gamble / Bounty – 2014
 BP – 2014
 Ralph Lauren – 2014
 Citi – 2014
 Highmark Insurance / Blue Cross Blue Shield – 2014
 Easton Hockey – 2009 to present
 Upper Deck Trading Cards – 2010 and 2014
 Panini Trading Cards – 2014
 Procter & Gamble / Crest – 2010
 Nike – 2010
 Sega / Mario & Sonic at the Winter Olympic Games – 2010

Career statistics

References

External links
 
 
 
 
 
 
 
 Montreal Stars bio
 Julie Chu  Video produced by Makers: Women Who Make America

1982 births
Living people
American expatriate ice hockey players in Canada
American people of Puerto Rican descent
American sportspeople of Chinese descent
American women's ice hockey forwards
Les Canadiennes de Montreal players
Choate Rosemary Hall alumni
Clarkson Cup champions
Harvard Crimson women's ice hockey players
Harvard College alumni
Ice hockey players from Connecticut
Ice hockey players from New York (state)
Ice hockey players at the 2002 Winter Olympics
Ice hockey players at the 2006 Winter Olympics
Ice hockey players at the 2010 Winter Olympics
Ice hockey players at the 2014 Winter Olympics
LGBT ice hockey players
American LGBT sportspeople
LGBT people from Connecticut
American LGBT people of Asian descent
Medalists at the 2002 Winter Olympics
Medalists at the 2006 Winter Olympics
Medalists at the 2010 Winter Olympics
Medalists at the 2014 Winter Olympics
Minnesota Whitecaps players
Olympic bronze medalists for the United States in ice hockey
Olympic silver medalists for the United States in ice hockey
Patty Kazmaier Award winners
Sportspeople from Fairfield, Connecticut